Solomon Miller (born December 6, 1964) is a former American football wide receiver in the National Football League (NFL) for the New York Giants and Tampa Bay Buccaneers.  He played college football at Utah State University and was drafted in the sixth round of the 1986 NFL Draft.

1964 births
Living people
Players of American football from Los Angeles
American football wide receivers
Utah State Aggies football players
New York Giants players
Tampa Bay Buccaneers players